Mount Fay is a mountain located on the border of Alberta and British Columbia on the Continental Divide in the Canadian Rockies. The mountain forms part of the backdrop to Moraine Lake in the Valley of the Ten Peaks of Banff National Park. It was named in 1902 by Charles E. Fay, an early explorer of the Canadian Rockies. He was a member of the party who attempted Mount Lefroy in 1896 when the first mountaineer to be killed in the Canadian Rockies occurred.

Notable ascents
 1904 First ascent by Gertrude Benham ahead of the mountain's namesake alpinist Charles E. Fay.
 1937 December 22 First winter ascent by E.R. Gibson, Doug Crosby, and Bob Hind
 1984 East Face (V/VI 5.8 WI5) FA by Barry Blanchard, David Cheesmond and Carl Tobin.  Repetition of the East Face and variation on the finish was done from 2–3 April 2019 by Brette Harrington, Luka Lindič and Ines Papert.

Geology

Like other mountains in Banff Park, Mount Fay is composed of sedimentary rock laid down during the Precambrian to Jurassic periods. Formed in shallow seas, this sedimentary rock was pushed east and over the top of younger rock during the Laramide orogeny.

Climate

Based on the Köppen climate classification, Mount Fay is located in a subarctic climate zone with cold, snowy winters, and mild summers. Winter temperatures can drop below −20 °C with wind chill factors below −30 °C.

See also
List of peaks on the Alberta–British Columbia border
List of mountains of Alberta
Mountains of British Columbia

References

Further reading
 Dave Birrell, 50 Roadside Panoramas in the Canadian Rockies, PP 86 – 87
 Maurice Isserman, Continental Divide: A History of American Mountaineering

Three-thousanders of Alberta
Three-thousanders of British Columbia
Mountains of Banff National Park